The John E. Anderson Graduate School of Management, also known as the UCLA Anderson School of Management, is the graduate business school at the University of California, Los Angeles, one of eleven professional schools. The school offers MBA (full-time, part-time, executive), PGPX, Financial Engineering, Business Analytics, and PhD degrees. It was named after American billionaire John E. Anderson in 1987, after he donated $15 million to the School of Management—the largest gift received from an individual by the University of California at the time.

The range of programs offered by Anderson includes: 
 Accounting minor for undergraduates
 Full Time MBA program
 Ph.D.
 Fully Employed MBA
 Executive MBA
 Master of Financial Engineering
Master of Science in Business Analytics
 Global EMBA for Asia Pacific
 Global EMBA for the Americas
 Post Graduate Program in Management for Executives (UCLA PGPX)
 Post Graduate Program in Management for Professionals (UCLA PGP PRO)

History

The School of Management at UCLA was founded in 1935, and the MBA degree was authorized by the Regents of the University of California four years later.  In its early years, the school was primarily an undergraduate institution, although this began to change in the 1950s after the appointment of Neil H. Jacoby as dean; the last undergraduate degree was awarded in 1969. UCLA is rare among public universities in the United States for not offering undergraduate business administration degrees.  Undergraduate degrees in business economics are offered through the UCLA College of Letters and Science.

In 1950, the school was renamed the School of Business Administration. Five years later, it became the Graduate School of Business Administration; in the 1970s the school's name was changed again to the Graduate School of Management.

In 1987, John E. Anderson (1917–2011), class of 1940, donated $15 million to the school and prompted the construction of a new complex at the north end of UCLA's campus. He later donated additional $25 million. The six-building,  facility, was designed by Henry N. Cobb of the architectural firm Pei Cobb Freed & Partners and Executive Architects Leidenfrost/Horowitz & Associates. It cost $75 million to construct and opened officially in 1995.

On May 13, 2015, Marion Anderson, widow of the late John Anderson, announced a $100 million donation (4th single-largest donation to a business school in the United States) to the school for fellowships and research, along with $40 million earmarked for initiating development of what is now known as the Marion Anderson Hall.

Recently, the school has been mostly self-funded, with only $6 million of government funding out of its $96 million budget in 2010-11. In fall 2010, the school proposed "financial self-sufficiency": Giving up all state funding, in return for freedom from some state rules and freedom to raise tuition. Critics called this proposal "privatization", but the school rejected this description, with former Dean Judy Olian saying, "This is not privatization.... We will continue to be part of UCLA and part of the state." The proposal met objections in the UCLA Academic Senate (faculty members from all UCLA departments), but was ultimately approved by the University of California President Mark Yudof in June 2013. 

In July 2018, Judy D. Olian, who served as the eighth dean of UCLA's Anderson School of Management, became Quinnipiac University's first female president when she took over for John Lahey, who retired in June 2018. Alfred Osborne, Associate Senior Dean of External Affairs and a professor at the UCLA Anderson School of Management, began serving as the school’s interim dean on July 1, 2018. Antonio Bernardo, a member of the finance faculty since 1994, was appointed UCLA Anderson’s ninth dean, effective July 1, 2019.

Campus

The school is located on north part of the UCLA campus. The four main buildings, Mullin, Cornell, Entrepreneurs, and Gold, form an inner circle at the corner of Sunset Boulevard and Westwood Plaza, which is the extension of Westwood Boulevard. Connected to the Gold building is the Collins building, which is named for alumnus James A. Collins, who is the chairman emeritus of Sizzler International, Inc. and who funded the John R. Wooden statue in front of Pauley Pavilion.

The new Marion Anderson Hall addition opened February 12, 2020. The 64,000 square-foot campus addition is estimated to cost $80 million and is one hundred percent donor-funded. Marion Anderson Hall is designed by a collaboration of Gensler, leading the interior architecture, and exterior design by Pei Cobb Freed & Partners, the same architectural firm that designed the original Anderson complex. The new building features four floors, interactive work, learning and event spaces, LEED Platinum certification, and will serve as the prominent entrance to the Anderson complex.

Graduate programs

MBA programs
As of 2011, UCLA Anderson enrolls 70 executive MBA, 90 global MBA, 280 fully employed MBA, and 360 full-time MBA students every year. UCLA Anderson’s teaching model combines case study, experiential learning, lecture and team projects. UCLA Anderson’s curriculum consists of ten core classes (required courses which cover a broad range of business fundamentals) and twelve (minimum) elective courses. Students are assigned to cohorts, called sections, of 65 students throughout the core curriculum.

The cohort system is almost entirely student run, with each cohort electing 17 different leadership positions ranging from President to Ethics chair.  In addition, there is the student-led Anderson Student Association (ASA) which deals with all issues of student life including company recruiting, social clubs and academic issues.

Students may choose (but are not required) to focus in one or more of the following areas:
Accounting
Decisions, Operations, and Technology Management
Communications, Media, and Entertainment Management
Entrepreneurial Studies
Finance
Global Economics and Management
Human Resources and Organizational Behavior
Information Systems
Marketing
Policy
Real Estate

Anderson also offers an Applied Management Research Program (AMR), consisting of a two-quarter team-based strategic consulting field study project required during the second year of study in lieu of the comprehensive exam for the master's degree.  Students complete strategic projects for companies partnering with the school, ultimately presenting recommendations to senior management.  The program has been around since the late 1960s and is presently led by Professor Gonzalo Freixes, its Faculty Director. In 2004, two alternatives to the field study were introduced: a Business Creation Option, and a research study option.

Master of Science in Business Analytics
The Anderson School of Management has also began accepting admissions for their Business Analytics program in 2017.

Executive education 
Since 1954, UCLA Anderson has been providing executive education to both organizations and individuals. According to the school the learning is not confined to just campus.

UCLA PGPX

The School also offers a PGPX programme for executives. According to Judy Olian, Dean, UCLA Anderson School of Management, the PGPX program has general management curriculum. UCLA PGPX is a comprehensive programme of one year primarily conducted by senior faculty members from the UCLA Anderson School of Management as well as industry experts. Besides this UCLA Anderson School of Management also offers executive programs on corporate governance, creativity & innovation, women leadership and media.

Doctoral program
The following academic units currently offer doctoral training:
Accounting
Behavioral Decision Making
Decisions, Operations & Technology Management
Finance
Global Economics and Management
Management and Organizations 
Marketing
Strategy

Rankings

Academic research rankings
UCLA Anderson was ranked 30th worldwide in the Naveen Jindal School of Management's Worldwide Business School Rankings Based on Research Contributions, from 2011 to 2015.

Online Journal

In September 2017, the School announced the publication of a new online journal chronicling its faculty’s research into crucial issues in business, the economy, and the wider world. The UCLA Anderson Review's content ranges from brief accounts of individual faculty research projects to long-read articles examining in-depth the issues explored by groups of UCLA Anderson faculty.

Research
The Harold and Pauline Price Center for Entrepreneurial Studies oversees all teaching, research, extracurricular, and community activities related to entrepreneurship at UCLA Anderson. It helps participants such as Head Start directors, early childcare professionals, and owners of developing businesses to direct and grow their organizations with a focused, well-managed, entrepreneurial flair.

The Laurence and Lori Fink Center for Finance & Investments (CFI) is named for BlackRock CEO Laurence D. Fink, and sponsors research, teaching and the application of financial knowledge in the global corporate and investment community. UCLA Anderson Forecast provides forecasts for the economies of California and the United States. Its quarterly conferences are attended by business, professional, and government decision-makers from across the U.S. The Richard S. Ziman Center For Real Estate was established in 2002. UCLA Anderson also has a Center for International Business Education and Research, which was founded in 1989 as part of a network of 28 CIBERs created by the United States Omnibus Trade and Competitiveness Act of 1988.

The Center for Managing Enterprises in Media, Entertainment and Sports (MEMES) examines the forces of change on the management of enterprises in entertainment and media including the impacts of technology, consolidation, and globalization.  The Center and its predecessors have been around since the late 1970s and have approximately 1,000 graduates in management positions in the media, entertainment, and technology industries.  150-200 MBA students each year participate in classes, lunches with executives, Days on the Job, field studies, speakers, and other activities with the Institute. The student-run organization linked to the MEMES Center is called the Entertainment Management Association (EMA).

Alumni

The UCLA Anderson alumni network consists of 39,000 members in over 25 chapters in over 75 countries worldwide.

Student life
Anderson also has a very strong focus on giving back to the community.  One of the biggest clubs on campus is the Challenge for Charity, a competition between the top West Coast business schools to put in the most volunteer hours per student and raise the most money for Special Olympics per student.

See also
Economics
Glossary of economics
List of United States business school rankings
List of business schools in the United States
Gerald Loeb Award

References

Business schools in California
Anderson School of Management
The Washington Campus
Educational institutions established in 1935
1935 establishments in California